Mesoparapylocheles michaeljacksoni is an extinct hermit crab species that existed during the Albian or Cenomanian in what is now Spain. It is the type species of the genus Mesoparapylocheles. It was described by René H.B. Fraaije, Adiël A. Klompmaker and Pedro Artal in 2012, and was named after the singer Michael Jackson.

The fossil was discovered in the Koskobilo Quarry, in the Navarrese town of Olazagutía, northern Spain.

See also
List of organisms named after famous people (born 1950–present)

References

Hermit crabs
Early Cretaceous crustaceans
Cultural depictions of Michael Jackson
Crustaceans described in 2012
Fossil taxa described in 2012
Fossils of Spain
Albian species first appearances
Cenomanian species extinctions
Early Cretaceous arthropods of Europe
Cretaceous Spain
Late Cretaceous crustaceans
Late Cretaceous arthropods of Europe